The 2005 Cincinnati mayoral election took place on November 8, 2005, to elect the Mayor of Cincinnati, Ohio. The election was officially nonpartisan, with the top two candidates from the September 13 primary advancing to the general election, regardless of party.

While the election was nonpartisan, both Mallory and Pepper were known Democrats. Also a known Democrat was Alicia Reece, who was eliminated in the primary. Sylvan Grisco and Charlie Winburn, who were both eliminated in the primary, were known Republicans

Primary election

General election

References

Mayoral elections in Cincinnati
2005 Ohio elections
Cincinnati